Helichrysum rosulatum is a species of flowering plant in the family Asteraceae.
It is found only in Yemen.
Its natural habitat is rocky areas.

References

rosulatum
Least concern plants
Taxonomy articles created by Polbot